Nalter may refer to various places in Pakistan:

 Naltar Valley
 Naltar Lakes
 Naltar Peak
 Naltar Pass
 Naltar Wildlife Sanctuary
 Naltar River, which joins the Hunza River